Hopefield can refer to:
 Hopefield, New South Wales in Australia
 Hopefield, Western Cape, in South Africa
 Hopefield, Bonnyrigg, in Scotland
 Hopefield, Caithness, in Scotland
 Hopefield, Arkansas, a former town in West Memphis, USA
 Hopefield (Warrenton, Virginia), listed on the NRHP in Fauquier County, Virginia
 Hope Field Aerodrome, near Ottawa, Canada

See also
 Hopfield (disambiguation)